The 16th Moscow International Film Festival was held from 7 to 18 July 1989. The Golden St. George was awarded to the Italian film The Icicle Thief directed by Maurizio Nichetti.

Jury
 Andrzej Wajda (Poland – President of the Jury)
 George Gund (United States)
 Emir Kusturica (Yugoslavia)
 Jiří Menzel (Czechoslovakia)
 Ibrahim Moussa (Italy)
 Aparna Sen (India)
 Jos Stelling (Netherlands)
 Kora Tsereteli (USSR)
 Zhang Yimou (China)

Films in competition
The following films were selected for the main competition:

Awards
 Golden St. George: The Icicle Thief by Maurizio Nichetti
 Silver St. George: A Visitor to a Museum by Konstantin Lopushansky
 Bronze St. George:
 Actor: Turo Pajala for Ariel
 Actress: Kang Soo-yeon for Come Come Come Upward
 Prix FIPRESCI: Ariel by Aki Kaurismäki
 Prix of Ecumenical Jury: A Visitor to a Museum by Konstantin Lopushansky
 Special Diploma: Bonded Woman by B. Narsing Rao (non-competition film)

References

External links
Moscow International Film Festival: 1989 at Internet Movie Database

1989
1989 film festivals
1989 in the Soviet Union
1989 in Moscow
July 1989 events in Europe